In Greek mythology, Agenor Agenor (Ancient Greek: Ἀγήνωρ or Αγήνορι Agēnor; English translation: 'heroic, manly') was a Psophian prince.

Family 
Agenor was the son of Phegeus, king of Psophis, in Arcadia. He was the brother of Pronous and Arsinoe, who was married to, and later abandoned by, the Argive Alcmaeon.

Mythology 
When Alcmaeon wanted to give the celebrated necklace and peplos of Harmonia—which had formerly belonged to Arsinoe—to his second wife Calirrhoe, the daughter of Achelous, he was slain by Agenor and Pronous at the instigation of Phegeus. But when the two brothers came to Delphi, where they intended to dedicate the necklace and peplos, they themselves were killed by Amphoterus and Acarnan, the sons of Alcmaeon and Calirrhoe.

Pausanias, who relates the same story, writes that the children of Phegeus were named Temenus, Axion, and Alphesiboea.

Notes

References 

 Apollodorus, The Library with an English Translation by Sir James George Frazer, F.B.A., F.R.S. in 2 Volumes, Cambridge, MA, Harvard University Press; London, William Heinemann Ltd. 1921. . Online version at the Perseus Digital Library. Greek text available from the same website.
Pausanias, Description of Greece with an English Translation by W.H.S. Jones, Litt.D., and H.A. Ormerod, M.A., in 4 Volumes. Cambridge, MA, Harvard University Press; London, William Heinemann Ltd. 1918. . Online version at the Perseus Digital Library
Pausanias, Graeciae Descriptio. 3 vols. Leipzig, Teubner. 1903.  Greek text available at the Perseus Digital Library.

Princes in Greek mythology
Arcadian mythology